The New York State Canalway Trail is a network of multi-use trails that runs parallel to current or former sections of the Erie, Oswego, Cayuga-Seneca, and Champlain canals. When completed, the system will have  of trails following current and former sections of the canals. The Erie and Champlain Canalway Trails are also part of the statewide Empire State Trail system.

A partnership of national, state, local and non-profit organizations is working to complete a continuous system of trails along these canals. Among the organizations involved are Parks & Trails New York, the New York State Canal Corporation and the Erie Canalway National Heritage Corridor.

Before the railroad era, New York had an extensive network of canals. As commercial freight shifted away from canals and towards rail and highways, communities along the canals needed new ways to generate commerce. In 1995, the Canal Corporation issued a recreation plan, which offered a view of the Canal as a linear park, including trails linking communities along the trail. Biking, hiking, snowmobiling, cross-country skiing, horseback riding, canoeing, and fishing are among activities promoted.

The original canals were flanked by towpaths, where mules walked while pulling barges through the canals. Many of the canalway trails follow former towpaths. Some trails follow canals that are still in use, serving mostly recreational boating. Other towpath trails pass by the ruins of abandoned locks and other structures. Many communities along the canal have made progress in establishing parks, improving towpaths and raising funds for restoration of old canal structures such as locks and aqueducts.

As of 2021, the Erie Canalway Trail is 100% complete. As part of the Empire State Trail project, the remaining gaps in the trail were filled and completed, both on-road and off-road, by the end of 2020.

Some of the individual sections are included below:

Erie Canalway trails 
Segments are listed from west to east.

Other trails

References

 
Hiking trails in New York (state)
Sports in Onondaga County, New York
Erie Canal in Syracuse, New York
Historic sites in Onondaga County, New York